William Hansen may refer to:

Politics
 William C. Hansen (1891–1983), American educator and politician
 William D. Hansen, American businessman and politician
 William O. Hansen (1860–1930), American politician
 Bill Hansen (politician) (born 1931), American politician in Iowa

Others
 William Hansen (actor) (1911–1975), American actor
 William Hansen (classicist) (born 1941), American scholar and author
William Hansen (field hockey) (born 1939), Belgian Olympic hockey player
 Bill Hansen (scientist) (born 1949), American scientist
 W. W. Hansen (William Webster Hansen, 1909–1949), American physicist
 Willy Hansen (Willy Falck Hansen, 1906–1978), Danish cyclist

See also
 William Hanson (disambiguation)